Melrose Highlands is an MBTA Commuter Rail station on the Haverhill Line located in the Melrose Highlands neighborhood of Melrose, Massachusetts. It is the most used station in the city, and was originally planned to be a station on the cancelled extension of the Orange Line to Reading. The station is accessible.

History

The Boston and Maine Railroad (B&M) opened its line from Wilmington Junction to Boston on July 1, 1845. Stoneham station opened on Franklin Street in the east part of Stoneham then or soon thereafter. In 1853, the east part of Stoneham was annexed into Melrose (itself split from Malden in 1850 due to development around the rail line) and soon renamed Melrose Highlands. 

Unusually, the B&M did not rename the station - likely to compete with the rival Boston and Lowell Railroad (B&L) for Stoneham traffic. (The B&L had its Montvale station slightly closer to downtown Stoneham, and opened the Stoneham Branch directly to the town in 1862.) The B&M leased the entire B&L system in 1887, ending the competition. The station was soon renamed as Melrose Highlands, though the Stoneham name was still locally used for some time thereafter.

The original station was on the west side of the tracks just south of Franklin Street. In 1903, the B&M built a larger station just north of Franklin Street. The station was demolished in the 1950s or 1960s.

The MBTA, formed in 1964 to subsidize suburban commuter rail service, began funding Reading Line service on January 18, 1965. Mini-high platforms on the north end of each platform opened in January 2006, making the station accessible.

References

External links

MBTA - Melrose Highlands
Station from Franklin Street from Google Maps Street View

MBTA Commuter Rail stations in Middlesex County, Massachusetts
Buildings and structures in Melrose, Massachusetts
Railway stations in the United States opened in 1845